Judith Ann 'Judy' Vernon (born 22 September 1945 in St. Louis, Missouri, United States) is a female English former 100 metres hurdler.

Athletics career
Vernon represented England and won a gold medal in the 100 metres hurdles at the 1974 Commonwealth Games in Christchurch, New Zealand.

A member of Mitcham Athletics Club, she also competed in the 1976 Summer Olympic Games in Munich in the 100 metres hurdles and in the Great Britain 4x100 metres relay team which finished in 7th place in the final.

References

1945 births
Living people
Track and field athletes from St. Louis
British female hurdlers
English female hurdlers
Olympic athletes of Great Britain
Athletes (track and field) at the 1972 Summer Olympics
Commonwealth Games medallists in athletics
Commonwealth Games gold medallists for England
Commonwealth Games silver medallists for England
Athletes (track and field) at the 1974 British Commonwealth Games
American sportswomen
21st-century American women
Medallists at the 1974 British Commonwealth Games